Don't Waste Your Time, Johnny! is a 2007 Italian biographical comedy-drama film written and directed by Fabrizio Bentivoglio. It is loosely based on real life events of musician Fausto Mesolella, a member of Piccola Orchestra Avion Travel.

It was nominated for four David di Donatello Awards, including Best New Director.

Plot

Cast 
 Antimo Merolillo as Fausto "Johnny" Ciaramella
Fabrizio Bentivoglio as Augusto Riverberi
Ernesto Mahieux as Raffaele Niro
Valeria Golino as Annamaria
Lina Sastri as Vincenza, Johnny's mother
 Peppe Servillo as Gerry Como
 Roberto De Francesco as Autore
Toni Servillo as Maestro Falasco
 Daria D'Antonio as Franca Marocco
Ugo Fangareggi as Pietro Tagnin
Luigi Montini as Discografico

See also   
 List of Italian films of 2007

References

External links

Italian comedy-drama films
2007 comedy-drama films
Italian biographical films
2000s biographical films
Biographical films about musicians
Cultural depictions of Italian men
Cultural depictions of rock musicians
2007 directorial debut films
2007 films
2000s Italian films